The Pauma Band of Luiseño Mission Indians of the Pauma and Yuima Reservation is a federally recognized tribe of Luiseño Indians in San Diego County, California. A total of five other federally recognized tribes of Luiseño are located in southern California.

Government
The Pauma Band is headquartered in Pauma Valley, California. The tribe is governed by a democratically elected four-person council. The current tribal administration is as follows.

 Tribal Chairman: Temet A. Aguilar
Vice Chairman: Sophia Salgado
Secretary: Menil Madrigal
Treasurer: Jenna Aguilar Linton
Member at Large: Venessa Brown

Reservation
The Pauma and Yuima Reservation, also known as the Pauma Indian Reservation, is a federal Indian reservation located in the northeastern corner of San Diego County. The Pauma and Yuima Reservation was established in 1872.

The main Pauma reservation and tribal headquarters are located in the Pauma Valley below Palomar Mountain. Two small and unpopulated tracts of land make up the Yuima reservation, in the foothills of the Palomar Mountains east of the main reservation.

The adjoining Pala Indian Reservation lies along the western border. The closest community is Valley Center, lying southwest of the reservations.

Economic development
The Pauma Band of Luiseño Mission Indians owns and operates Casino Pauma, Pauma Bay Café, Casino Pauma Deli, Red Parrot Pizza, and the Red Parrot Lounge, all located in Pauma Valley. Revenues from gaming are used to support health, welfare and education of their people, as well as for infrastructure.

Education
The reservation is served by the Pauma Elementary School District and Escondido Union High School District.

See also
Indigenous peoples of California

Notes

References
 Pritzker, Barry M. A Native American Encyclopedia: History, Culture, and Peoples. Oxford: Oxford University Press, 2000.

External links
 Official Pauma Band of Luiseño Indians website

Native American tribes in San Diego County, California
Luiseño
Palomar Mountains
Federally recognized tribes in the United States
Native American tribes in California